The 1991 Chattanooga Moccasins football team represented the University of Tennessee at Chattanooga as a member of the Southern Conference (SoCon) in the 1991 NCAA Division I-AA football season. The Moccasins were led by eighth-year head coach Buddy Nix and played their home games at Chamberlain Field. Southern Conference. They finished the season 7–4 overall and 4–3 in SoCon play to tie for fourth place.

Schedule

References

Chattanooga
Chattanooga Mocs football seasons
Chattanooga Moccasins football